Prince of Chin may refer to:

Prince of Qin (disambiguation) (Prince of Ch'in in Wade–Giles)
Prince of Jin (disambiguation) (Prince of Chin in Wade–Giles)